Zachariä, Zachariae is a German surname. Notable people with the surname include:

 Francis Zachariae (1852–1936), Danish businessman, local historic publisher and philanthropist
 Karl Salomo Zachariae von Lingenthal (1769–1843), German jurist
 Karl Eduard Zachariae von Lingenthal (1812–1894), German jurist

See also
 Zachariae Isstrom, a large glacier located in King Frederick VIII Land, northeast Greenland

German-language surnames